See also Midland, Kings County, New Brunswick for other identically named community in New Brunswick.

Midland is a community in Elgin Parish, Albert County in the Canadian province of New Brunswick.

History

Notable people

See also
List of communities in New Brunswick

Neighbouring communities
Elgin
Goshen

Communities in Albert County, New Brunswick